Sindosh is a rural locality (a village) in Kubenskoye Rural Settlement, Vologodsky District, Vologda Oblast, Russia. The population was 6 as of 2002.

Geography 
Sindosh is located 58 km northwest of Vologda (the district's administrative centre) by road. Androntsevo is the nearest locality.  the Arctic homeland in the Vedas of the Indians, they came from the north to India and named the rivers as in the homeland of the Indus- Sind- Sindosh

References 

Rural localities in Vologodsky District